Lisa McShea and Milagros Sequera were the defending champions, but Sequera did not compete this year. McShea teamed up with Abigail Spears and lost in semifinals to tournament runners-up Marta Domachowska and Marlene Weingärtner.

Rosa María Andrés Rodríguez and Andreea Ehritt-Vanc won the title by defeating Marta Domachowska and Marlene Weingärtner 6–3, 6–1 in the final.

Seeds

Draw

External links
Draws (ITF) 
Draws (WTA)

2005 Internationaux de Strasbourg Doubles
Internationaux de Strasbourg Doubles
2005 in French tennis